Federico Rafael Mendes Peña (born 30 March 1999) is a Trinidadian professional footballer.

Early life
Peña was born in Port of Spain, Trinidad and Tobago. He moved to Mississauga, Canada, before settling in Winnipeg, Canada in 2009. He began playing youth soccer in Canada with Winnipeg South End United SC in 2009. In 2013, he began playing with Bonivital SC, moving to Granite United from 2015 to 2017. He then joined the youth system of Belgian club Gent, playing for the U21 squad, while also training with the first team on occasion. In 2018, he joined the U21 team of Standard Liège.

Club career
In March 2019, Peña went on trial with Valour FC of the Canadian Premier League ahead of the 2019 season. In April 2019, Peña signed with the club. He appeared in six of his team's seven matches in the 2020 shortened season, including having a red card overturned ahead of the final match of the season. In December 2020, he the club picked up his option for the 2021 season. During the 2021 season, his playing time greatly increased, appearing in 26 matches, including being named Man of the Match in a 1-0 victory over Forge FC on July 11, 2021. In January 2022, he once again re-signed with the club for another season, with the club re-structing his contract, rather than just picking up his club option. In December 2022, he departed the club, upon the expiry of his contract.

International career
Peña is eligible to represent both Canada or Trinidad and Tobago internationally. In 2013 and 2014, Peña made his debut in the Canada national team, attending two identification camps for the Canada U15 team.

In March 2020, he was set to be called up by the Trinidad and Tobago national team ahead of a friendly against Canada, but it was ultimately cancelled due to the COVID-19 pandemic. After remaining in contact with the national team, he was again called up in January 2021 ahead of a friendly against the United States. He made his debut in that match on 31 January, as a starter.

Personal
Peña is related to former Trinidad and Tobago national team goalkeeper Shaka Hislop. Peña's great-grandfather immigrated to Trinidad and Tobago from Portugal, which allowed Peña to obtain Portuguese citizenship, which enabled him to obtain a European passport allowing him to sign with Gent's youth teams.

Career statistics

References

External links

1999 births
Living people
Association football fullbacks
Canadian soccer players
Trinidad and Tobago footballers
Sportspeople from Port of Spain
Soccer players from Winnipeg
Trinidad and Tobago emigrants to Canada
Naturalized citizens of Canada
Canadian expatriate soccer players
Trinidad and Tobago expatriate footballers
Expatriate footballers in Belgium
Canadian expatriate sportspeople in Belgium
Trinidad and Tobago expatriate sportspeople in Belgium
Valour FC players
Canadian Premier League players
Trinidad and Tobago international footballers